Kristina Sessa is Professor of History at Ohio State University. She is an expert on the cultural history of the late antique and early medieval Mediterranean world from ca. 300-700 CE.

Education 
Sessa was awarded an A.B. in Religion from Princeton University in 1992, and a Masters in Medieval History from the University of California, Berkeley (1996). She received her PhD from the University of California, Berkeley in 2003. Her thesis was entitled The Household and the Bishop: Establishing Episcopal Authority in Late Antique Rome.

Career 
Sessa was Assistant Professor of Ancient Mediterranean History at Claremont McKenna College 2003–06. She joined the Department of History at Ohio State University as associate professor in 2007. Sessa was awarded the 2006 Graves Award for her project 'Fighting for Christ and Rome: Christianity and the Culture of War in Late Antiquity (300-600 CE)'. She was a Fellow at the American Academy in Rome (2001–02) and the Italian Academy for Advanced Studies in America at Columbia University (2006–07). She was a visiting scholar at the Centre for Late Antiquity at Manchester University. She received an ACLS Fellowship for her project, 'The Church at War in Late Antiquity, 350-700 CE'. With Ra’anan Boustan, she edits the journal Studies in Late Antiquity for the University of California Press.

Selected bibliography 

 The Formation of Papal Authority in Late Antique Italy: Roman Bishops and the Domestic Sphere (Cambridge: Cambridge University Press, 2012)
 (co-editor with Jonathan J. Arnold and Michael Shane Bjornlie) A Companion to Ostrogothic Italy (Ledien: Brill, 2016)
 Daily Life in Late Antiquity (Cambridge: Cambridge University Press, 2018)

External links 

 Byzantium and Friends Podcast: https://www.medievalists.net/2020/09/environmental-history-kristina-sessa/
 Lecture, 'The Justinianic Plague and the End of Antiquity? Recent Research and New Directions', Center for Medieval Studies, Minnesota: https://www.youtube.com/watch?v=-AQPsZY44Mw

References 

Living people
Princeton University alumni
American women historians
Ohio State University faculty
Historians of antiquity
Historians of the Mediterranean
University of California, Berkeley alumni
Year of birth missing (living people)